Baer functions  and , named after Karl Baer, are solutions of the Baer differential equation

which arises when separation of variables is applied to the Laplace equation in paraboloidal coordinates. By substituting a power series Ansatz into the differential equation, formal series can be constructed for the Baer functions. For instance,  

Thus, in contrast with many other special functions of mathematical physics, Baer functions cannot in general be expressed in terms of hypergeometric functions.

The Baer wave equation is a generalization which results from separating variables in the Helmholtz equation in paraboloidal coordinates:

which reduces to the original Baer equation when .

References

Bibliography
 (free online access to the appendix on Baer functions)

External links
 

Ordinary differential equations
Special functions